The Grossman Nunataks are a group of about a dozen nunataks in Palmer Land, Antarctica, rising  in elevation and running northwest–southeast for  between the Lyon Nunataks and the Sky-Hi Nunataks. The group includes features from the Smith Nunataks and the Whitmill Nunatak in the northwest to Gaylord Nunatak and Neff Nunatak in the southeast. The group was mapped by the United States Geological Survey (USGS) from surveys and U.S. Navy aerial photographs, 1961–68, and from U.S. Landsat imagery, 1973–74. It was named by the Advisory Committee on Antarctic Names in 1994 after Charles Grossman, formerly Chief of the Shaded Relief and Special Graphics Unit, Branch of Special Maps, USGS, a specialist in the production of maps of Antarctica.

References

Nunataks of Palmer Land